Mahavira TV is a Hindi-language 24/7 television channel, owned by Mahavira Limited, in India.

References

Hindi-language television channels in India
Television channels and stations established in 2015
Hindi-language television stations
Television channels based in Noida
2015 establishments in Uttar Pradesh